WKCE (1180 kHz) is a commercial AM radio station in Knoxville, Tennessee. and airs an oldies radio format. The station is branded as  1180 WKCE. Many of the station's previous local sports talk shows were about Tennessee Volunteers football.

WKCE operates at 10,000 watts by day, using a non-directional antenna. But because AM 1180 is a clear-channel frequency, reserved for Class A WHAM in Rochester, New York, WKCE must reduce power to 2,600 watts during critical hours and sign-off at night. The transmitter is located off Strawberry Plains Pike in Knoxville.

History

A construction permit to build a radio station on AM 1180 was first issued in December 1986. On June 1, 1988, WHJM first signed on. It was owned by Morgan Broadcasting Company, and was an affiliate of the former Satellite Music Network's "Pure Gold" service, playing oldies from the 1960s and 70s. Studios and offices were located at 802 S. Central Avenue in downtown Knoxville.

By 1990, the station had changed formats from oldies to adult standards, using SMN's Stardust music service. In 1993, WHJM changed its format to Christian country and Southern Gospel music. Later, the station was programmed as a talk radio outlet.

Morgan Broadcasting Co., of which Harry Morgan was president, sold WHJM and WKCE to Kirkland Wireless Broadcasters, Inc. for $400,000, in a deal reported February 24, 2002. Upon acquisition, the station's call letters were changed to WVLZ.

From January 2009 until August 29, 2014, WVLZ 1180 was known as "Tennessee Sports Radio." The station's programming included show hosts such as former University of Tennessee quarterback Erik Ainge and former UT wide receiver Jayson Swain.

On August 29, 2014, WVLZ changed branding and reverted to its earlier format as "Oldies 1180," but returned to sports as "Sports Radio 1180 The VLZ" on Monday, January 5, 2015.

Kirkland Wireless Broadcasters sold WVLZ to John Pirkle's Oak Ridge FM, Inc. effective July 11, 2018 for $30,000. The station changed its call sign to WKCE on September 19, 2018 and changed their format to oldies.

Effective December 31, 2018, Oak Ridge FM, Inc sold the station to Mid-Century Radio LLC.

Previous logo

References

External links

KCE (AM)
KCE
Radio stations established in 1988
1988 establishments in Tennessee